Ráquira, is a municipality and town in Boyacá Department, Colombia, part of the subregion of the Ricaurte Province. It borders Tinjacá and Sutamarchán in the north, Guachetá, Cundinamarca in the south, in the east Sáchica and Samacá and in the west San Miguel de Sema and Lake Fúquene.

Etymology 
In Chibcha, Ráquira means "Village of the pans".

History 
The area of Ráquira was inhabited by the Muisca in the centuries before the Spanish conquest of the central highlands of the Colombian Andes. Already in those times Ráquira was famous for its ceramics due to the clay of the area.

In March 1537 conquistador Gonzalo Jiménez de Quesada crossed the valley around Ráquira. Modern Ráquira was founded on October 18, 1580 by friar Francisco de Orejuela.

Economy 
About three quarters of the economy of Ráquira is centered on the handcrafts. Other economical activities are agriculture, livestock farming and mining.

Tourism 
Ráquira is famous in Colombia for its colony of artisans, who produce traditional northern Andean pottery & hand-woven goods. The Sunday market is especially a popular time to visit. Ráquira is also known for its colorful houses that contrast with the famous nearby town of Villa de Leyva.

Gallery

References

External links 

Municipalities of Boyacá Department
Populated places established in 1580
1580 establishments in the Spanish Empire
Muisca Confederation
Muysccubun